Mumbai South Lok Sabha constituency is one of the 48 Lok Sabha (parliamentary) constituencies of Maharashtra state in western India.

Assembly segments
Presently, after the implementation of the Presidential notification on delimitation on 19 February 2008, Mumbai South Lok Sabha constituency comprises six Vidhan Sabha (legislative assembly) segments. These segments are:

Members of Parliament

Election results

General elections 1951

General elections 1957

General elections 1962

General elections 1967

General elections 1971

General elections 1977

General elections 1980

General elections 1984

 *After the performance of the INC(I) in the 1980 election, it was recognized as the official successor to the Congress. Changes based on the elected MP's performance as INC(I) candidate in the previous election.

General elections 1989

Oct. 11, 1988: JANATA DAL formed following the Merger of Janata Party, Janata Party (Secular) Lok Dal, Indian National Congress (Urs) and Jan Morcha under the leadership of V.P.Singh.

General elections 1991

General elections 1996

General elections 1998

General elections 1999

General elections 2004

General elections 2009

General elections 2014

General elections 2019

See also
 Mumbai
 List of Constituencies of the Lok Sabha

Notes

Dear Arvind Sawant Sir, Expand Staff of MTNL Till Dahanu Road.

External links
Mumbai South lok sabha  constituency election 2019 results details

Politics of Mumbai
Lok Sabha constituencies in Maharashtra
Lok Sabha constituencies in Mumbai